Hexaplex angularis is a species of sea snail, a marine gastropod mollusk in the family Muricidae, the murex snails or rock snails.

Description

Distribution

References

 Sowerby, G.B. II, 1879 Murex. In: Thesaurus conchyliorum or genera of shells, vol. 4, p. 55 p, 24 pls
 Poirier, J., 1883. Révision des Murex. Nouvelles Archives du Muséum d'Histoire naturelle 5: 13–128, sér. série 2
 Bernard P.A. (1984). Coquillages du Gabon [Shells of Gabon]. Pierre A. Bernard: Libreville, Gabon. 140 pp, 75 plates, illus.

External links
 MNHN, Paris: syntype
 Adams A. (1853 ["1851"]). Descriptions of several new species of Murex, Rissoina, Planaxis, and Eulima, from the Cumingian collection. Proceedings of the Zoological Society of London. (1851): 267–272
 Sowerby, G. B., I; Sowerby, G. B., II. (1832–1841). The conchological illustrations or, Coloured figures of all the hitherto unfigured recent shells. London, privately published
 Reeve L.A. (1845–1849). Monograph of the genus Murex. In: Conchologia Iconica, or, illustrations of the shells of molluscous animals, vol. 3, pl. 1-37 and unpaginated text. L. Reeve & Co., London

Hexaplex
Gastropods described in 1822